The Christian Evangelical Church in Minahasa (Gereja Masehi Injii di Minahasa) is a Protestant, Calvinist and Reformed church in Indonesia. It was founded in North Sulawesi on 30 September 1934.

Christianity was introduced to Minahasa by Johann Friedrich Riedel and Johann Gottlieb Schwarz. They were educated in the Netherlands and were sent by the Netherlands Missionary Society. By the 1880s the Christian population grew to 80,000. In 1876 it became part of the colonial state church the Protestant Church in Indonesia. The first synod was in 1934, at which it adopted its current name. Sister church relations were established with the Reformed Church in the Netherlands, Lutheran World Federation, Presbyterian Church in Korea, Reformed Church in America, and Uniting Church in Australia.

Membership of the church is 850,000 in 839 parishes.

The Christian Evangelical Church in Minahasa is a member of World Communion of Reformed Churches.

References

External links 
 

1934 establishments in the Dutch East Indies
Calvinist denominations established in the 20th century
Evangelical denominations in Asia
Lutheran denominations established in the 20th century
Members of the World Communion of Reformed Churches
Reformed denominations in Indonesia